The Duet free routine competition at the 2019 World Aquatics Championships was held on 16 and 18 July 2019.

Results
The preliminary round was started on 16 July at 11:00. The final was held on 18 July at 19:00.

Green denotes finalists

References

Duet free routine